Trehowell Halt was a small railway station located about a mile and a half south of Chirk, just inside the English border south of an overbridge on the minor road between Trehowell and Chirk Bank. It was opened by the Great Western Railway as part of its halt construction programme of the 1930s, aimed at countering emergent competition from bus services. Although the halt is gone the railway is still open today as part of the Shrewsbury to Chester Line.

References

Neighbouring stations

External links
 Trehowell Halt on navigable 1946 O.S. map
 Disused Stations: Trehowell Halt

Disused railway stations in Shropshire
Former Great Western Railway stations
Railway stations in Great Britain opened in 1935
Railway stations in Great Britain closed in 1951